Big Shamus, Little Shamus is an American detective drama series that aired on CBS on Saturday nights at 9:00 p.m Eastern Time for two weeks from September 29, 1979 to October 6, 1979.
The show performed so poorly in the ratings, it was canceled after only two episodes were broadcast.

Premise
The Series focuses on Arnie Sutter, the veteran house detective at The Ansonia Hotel in Atlantic City, New Jersey, and his thirteen-year-old son Max, who solved crimes at the hotel casino relating to legalized gambling.

Cast
 Brian Dennehy as Arnie Sutter
 Doug McKeon as Max Sutter
 George Wyner as George Korman
 Kathryn Leigh Scott as Stephanie Marsh
 Ty Henderson as Jerry Wilson
 Cynthia Sikes Yorkin as Jingels Lodestar

Episodes

References

External links

Television shows set in New Jersey
1979 American television series debuts
1979 American television series endings
CBS original programming
Television series by Lorimar Television